Robert Fitzgerald Earle MBE (born 27 January 1965) is an English-born Jamaican former international footballer who played as an attacking midfielder. He played 578 league games in senior club football, scoring 136 goals.

A former youth player with Stoke City, Earle broke into the professional game with Port Vale in 1982. He spent nine years at the Burslem based club, helping "The Vale" to promotion out of the Fourth Division in 1982–83 and 1985–86, and out of the Third Division via the play-offs in 1989; he was later voted the club's PFA Fans' Favourites. He moved on to Wimbledon in 1991, where he also spent nine years. He made nearly 300 league games for each club, scoring 77 and 59 goals respectively. He also represented Jamaica on 8 occasions between 1997 and 1998, scoring one international goal. He appeared in the 1998 World Cup, scoring his nation's first ever goal in the finals.

Following his retirement in 2000, Earle has established himself in the world of football journalism. He regularly appears in print, on the radio and on television. He was dismissed from his punditry role with ITV in 2010 after he passed ITV World Cup tickets to a third party. After spending time as television broadcast analyst for the Portland Timbers of Major League Soccer, he is now a commentator for the Premier League on NBC Sports.

Club career

Port Vale
An attacking midfielder, Earle was a junior player at Stoke City whilst he attended Longton High School. However, after suffering from a broken leg he was released from the Victoria Ground, at which point he was snapped up by Stoke's local rivals Port Vale, where he turned professional in 1982.

Earle made his Port Vale debut under John McGrath in a 1–0 defeat by Swindon Town at the County Ground on 28 August 1982. He scored his first goal in his next appearance, in a 4–1 win over Aldershot at the Recreation Ground. He finished the 1982–83 campaign with one goal in nine appearances, as the "Valiants" won promotion out of the Fourth Division. He made 13 appearances in 1983–84; John Rudge replaced McGrath as manager in December, but could not stop the club from sliding straight back out of the Third Division.

Earle won a regular first team place in August 1984, and hit 19 goals in 56 games in 1984–85, including a hat-trick against Hereford United at Vale Park on 2 February; Earle and Alistair Brown's partnership got the club a combined total of 40 goals. An ever-present in the 1985–86 Fourth Division promotion squad, he scored 17 goals in 58 games; he and strike partner Andy Jones bagged a total of 35 goals for the club. Earle made 142 consecutive appearances between September 1984 and January 1987, the run coming to an end due to a groin strain. The strain led to a hernia operation in the autumn of 1987, but he returned to first team action in January 1988. He scored seven goals in 35 games in 1986–87 and scored four goals in 11 games in 1987–88. That season he played in the FA Cup upset when Vale knocked out Tottenham Hotspur. A regular in the 1988–89 season, Rudge claimed that Earle and Ray Walker was one of the best-ever midfield partnerships at the Vale. He scored both goals past Bristol Rovers in the two-legged 1989 play-off final that took Vale through to the Second Division. After the match Earle wept in the tunnel, such was his emotions to have taken his local team to victory in the play-off final. Over the course of the 1988–89 campaign he scored 19 goals in 57 appearances.

He scored 12 goals in 52 games in 1989–90, including one in a 1–1 draw with Stoke City at the Victoria Ground on 23 September. He remained a vital player in 1990–91, hitting the net 11 times in 37 appearances. In all, 'The Black Pearl', as he was affectionately known, played 357 times for the "Valiants" and scored 90 goals. A cult hero, he is considered one of the best midfielders ever to play for the club. In July 1991 he was transferred to Wimbledon for a fee of £775,000 (and 30% of any future transfer fee above that figure). It was later reported that Wimbledon chairman Sam Hammam had locked Earle in a room during transfer negotiations and only let him out when he agreed to sign for Wimbledon.

Wimbledon
Earle played an important part in the South London club's success during the nineties, and in particular, the club's 'Crazy Gang' mentality which fostered team spirit and intimidated opposing players. He played alongside cult figures such as Aidan Newhouse, John Fashanu, Vinnie Jones, Lawrie Sanchez, Jason Euell, Dean Holdsworth, Marcus Gayle, Andy Clarke and Efan Ekoku. Earle was known for his late runs into the box and his ability at finishing and agility at heading the ball.

His first season at the club was turbulent, as manager Ray Harford was replaced by Peter Withe, who in turn was replaced by Joe Kinnear; nevertheless Earle scored 14 league goals to help the "Dons" to maintain to their top-flight status. He scored seven goals in the newly formed Premier League in the 1992–93 season, including two in a 3–2 win over Liverpool at Anfield, and nine goals in 1993–94 – when Wimbledon finished a club best sixth in the final table.

After injury limited him to nine goalless appearances in 1994–95 (when Wimbledon still finished ninth), he regained his fitness for the following season and was appointed club captain. His 11 goals in 1995–96 went some way towards securing Wimbledon's survival in 15th place; he scored against Manchester United, Tottenham Hotspur, Chelsea, Arsenal, Manchester City, Blackburn Rovers and Bolton Wanderers. Under his captaincy in 1996–97, the Selhurst Park side reached the semi-finals of both the FA Cup and League Cup, where they were beaten by eventual winners Chelsea and Leicester City respectively. In February 1997, he was handed the Premier League Player of the Month award.

The club survived again in 1997–98, though dropped from fourth in December to 15th by the season's end. He scored seven goals in all competitions in 1998–99 as Wimbledon again reached the semi-finals of the League Cup; however they finished just two places and six points above the Premier League relegation zone. The "Dons" then struggled under new manager Egil Olsen, and were relegated on the final day of the 1999–2000 season after losing 2–0 to Southampton at The Dell.

During a reserve team game for Wimbledon in 2000, Earle sustained a heavy blow to the stomach and became seriously ill with a ruptured pancreas. At the age of 35 he was forced to give up playing in November 2000. His retirement coincided with the end of the 'Crazy Gang'. In nine years as a Wimbledon player, he made 244 league appearances for the South London club, scoring 59 goals. Towards his end of his time at the club he began coaching the reserve team.

International career
Though English-born, Earle was eligible to play for Jamaica at international level because of his Jamaican parents. He hoped to be called up to the England squad, before he accepted the call-up from Jamaica at the age of 32. Earle was the scorer of Jamaica's first ever World Cup finals goal, in a 3–1 defeat by Croatia at the Stade Félix-Bollaert, at the 1998 World Cup in France. He played in all three of the Group H games, as Jamaica lost 5–0 to Argentina at Parc des Princes and beat Japan 2–1 at Stade de Gerland.

Media work
Since his retirement, Earle has moved into sports journalism and has worked for Capital Radio, Radio 5 Live, BBC, ESPN, ITV, Sky Sports and OnDigital. Earle was a regular pundit on ITV's football coverage, as well as World Football Daily, and occasionally joins the team on ESPN PressPass. He has also written columns for the London Evening Standard and for the Stoke-on-Trent Evening Sentinel.

In 2005, he took part on BBC's Strictly African Dancing as part of Africa Lives season; he scored 33 and won the competition. He also appeared in the 2007 edition of MasterChef.

In June 2010, he had his £150,000 a year contract with ITV cancelled for giving away World Cup tickets for the Netherlands v Denmark match. Meant for family and friends, he passed them onwards to a friend who then sold them to Bavaria Brewery. The Brewery company orchestrated an ambush marketing event, in breach of FIFA rules. The incident also led to him losing his role as an ambassador for England's 2018 World Cup bid. Earle described his actions as "naive" and insisted that he had "not profited in any way". It later emerged that ITV had given Earle 400 free tickets for the tournament, including 40 for the final itself. This allocation had a RRP of around £70,000. Not permitted to sell the tickets Earle had freely given them out to friends and family, unaware that a 'close friend' would then sell a significant number on to the Dutch company.

In March 2011 he became a broadcasting analyst at US Major League Soccer side Portland Timbers. In 2004, he was inducted into the Hall of Fame of Show Racism the Red Card. He has also appeared in television commercials promoting blood donation.

In 2013, he became one of the lead studio analysts for NBC Sports' coverage of the Premier League and a co-commentator on their Match of the Day and Premier League Download programmes.

Personal life
Earle attended Longton High School in Longton, Stoke-on-Trent. UK magazine The Vegetarian Society stated that Earle is a vegetarian.

He got married in summer 1989. His son, Otis, is also a footballer and was drafted by FC Dallas at the 2015 MLS SuperDraft.

Awards
Earle was appointed an MBE in 1999 for his services to football. In 2007, he was voted as Port Vale's PFA Fans' Favourites. In 2009, he was inducted into the English Football Hall of Fame as 'Football Foundation Community Champion'. In May 2019, he was voted into the "Ultimate Port Vale XI" by members of the OneValeFan supporter website.

Career statistics

Club

International

Scores and results list Jamaica's goal tally first, score column indicates score after each Earle goal.

Honours
Port Vale
Football League Fourth Division third-place promotion: 1982–83
Football League Fourth Division fourth-place promotion: 1985–86
Football League Third Division play-offs: 1989

Individual
Premier League Player of the Month: February 1997
PFA Fans' Favourites player (Port Vale): 2007

References

External links

Profile at MTC Talent Management

1965 births
Living people
Sportspeople from Newcastle-under-Lyme
English sportspeople of Jamaican descent
English footballers
Black British sportsmen
Jamaican footballers
Jamaica international footballers
Association football midfielders
Stoke City F.C. players
Port Vale F.C. players
Wimbledon F.C. players
1998 FIFA World Cup players
English Football League players
Premier League players
Wimbledon F.C. non-playing staff
Members of the Order of the British Empire
British association football commentators
English television presenters
English sportswriters
English Football Hall of Fame inductees
Jamaican journalists
English male journalists
English columnists
Major League Soccer broadcasters
Association football coaches